Humera Khan Institute of Management Studies and Research (HKIMSR) is a college in Mumbai, India. It was founded by the educationist Prof. Javed Khan. HKIMSR is situated in Mumbai, Jogshwari West, and offers full-time management studies program affiliated to University of Mumbai, including a two-year full time master's degree in management studies (MMS).

Academics
The institute offers a Master of Management Studies (MMS), validated by the University of Mumbai, with specialization in marketing management, finance management, operations, or human resource management.

Admission is available to graduates in any stream, with scores from MHT-CET (common entrance test) conducted by the directorate of technical education, Maharashtra state / CMAT (common management admission test) conducted by the AICTE.

HKIMSR also offers a postgraduate diploma course in management (PGDM).

See also
Oriental Institute of Management
H K College of Pharmacy
Oriental Education Society
University of Mumbai
Mumbai

External links

Business schools in Mumbai